Daram, officially the Municipality of Daram, is a 3rd class municipality in the province of Samar, Philippines. According to the 2020 census, it has a population of 41,608 people.

Etymology
The origin of the name Daram is from a type of bird, called Darangsiyao, that guided the initial settlers to the island. Some time later, a Spaniard inquiring about the name of the island, mistook the name for "Daramsiyao". This was further shortened to the current name of Daram. The original name of Daramsiyao is still in use as the name of the annual festival held in Poblacion 1 on January 15.

History
The Island was originally part of the municipality of Zumarraga, Samar, and mostly inhabited by a few fisher-folk and travelers from other places whose primary source of income was fishing and farming.
 
As the years passed Daram began to grow in population and economic activities through settlers and travelers who constructed dwelling units sporadically along the coastlines of the islands.

Separation from Zumarraga
On 1 September 1949, President Elpidio Quirino signed Executive Order No. 262. This order ceded the islands of Daram and Parasan from the Municipality of Zumarraga and created the independent Municipality of Daram, with barrio (now barangay) Daram as the municipal seat. On the current list of barangay for the Municipality of Daram, there is no barangay named Daram.

Geography
Daram has a total land area of 14,026 hectares (34,659 acres). The town is composed of two major islands; Daram Island and Parasan Island. Other islands include Poro Island and Danaodanauan Island (uninhabited).

The main island features mountainous interiors with very narrow coastal areas. Mountain ranges occupy the major portion of the island municipality.

Daram has a combination of warm and cool climatic zones, thus the prevailing climate is ideal for the cultivation of a wide range of agricultural crops. There is no distinct dry season but the heavy wet season generally occurs in December.

Daram lies within the western part of Samar Sea and the Zumarraga Channel. The north and western boundary is the Samar Sea; the eastern boundary is the Zumarraga Channel; the southern boundary is Daram Channel.

It can be reached by a 30-minute boat ride from the provincial capital, Catbalogan, and Northern Leyte.

Barangays

Daram is politically subdivided into 58 barangays.

Climate

Demographics

Language
The native language of the majority in Daram is Samarnon-Waray-Waray (also known as Waraynon, Samarnon, or Samar-Leyte Visayan) and to a lesser degree Cebuano, both Visayan languages. Majority of the residents also speak and understand Tagalog and English.

Religion 
Most of the inhabitants of Daram are Roman Catholics and a small number of born again. Because of the large number of Catholics, like other places in Philippines, they also celebrate fiesta (festival).

Economy 

Being an island municipality, the main livelihood is fishing and agriculture. Seafood is a local specialty, in fact, many fish are sold in the markets of nearby Catbalogan and Tacloban.

The major fishing products caught in the seas around Daram are galonggong, alumahan, tamban, pompano, bisugo (bream), lapu-lapu, rabbitfish, slipmouth and assorted. Other fish resources are seaweed, mussels/oysters, crabs and shells.

Kelp seaweed is also a major harvest and exported worldwide.

Agricultural income is derived mostly from coconuts, bananas, corn and other crops such as sweet potato, cassava, and legumes.

Recently, there is a surge in tourism activity in Daram with the rise in popularity of Kandiwata islet, a rock formation that has become a popular tourist destination. Nearby Monbon beach is also a popular recreation site for beach campers and overnight stay for Kandiwata tourists.

Government
Like all other municipalities in the Philippines, Daram is governed from the Municipal Hall by a Mayor and the Sangguniang Panlungsod which is composed of the city (municipality) Vice Mayor as Presiding Officer, regular Sanggunian members (Councilors), the President of the Daram Chapter of the League of Barangays of the Philippines and the President of the Daram Chapter of the Sangguniang Kabataan (Student Leaders). These elected officials are entitled to three-year terms.

These political leaders exercise and perform the legislative powers and duties as provided for under Republic Act No. 7160, otherwise known as the Local Government Code of 1991. They are empowered to consider and conduct thorough study all matters brought to their attention and consequently pass resolutions, enact ordinances and introduce recommendations.

In 2010, it has a budgetary allocation of PHP 19.8 million from the Philippine government.

Elected officials (2016-2019)

Mayor
Philip Astorga (Nationalist People's Coalition)

Vice mayor
Lucia Astorga (Nationalist People's Coalition)

Municipal councilors
Ben Amistoso (Nationalist People's Coalition)
Boboy Dacallos (Nationalist People's Coalition)
Jimmy Barrantes (Nationalist People's Coalition)
Edgar Danday (Nationalist People's Coalition)
Florentino Carcellar Jr. (Nationalist People's Coalition)
Joan Astorga (Independent)
Reden Lepasana (Nationalist People's Coalition)
Danedave Cariño (Nationalist People's Coalition)

Elected officials (2013-2016)
Mayor
Lo Astorga (Liberal Party)

Vice mayor
Ben Amistoso (Independent)

Municipal councilors
Boboy Dacallos (Nationalist People's Coalition)
Henry Astorga (Independent)
Buddy Astorga (Nationalist People's Coalition)
Jimmy Barrantes (Independent)
Reden Lepasana (Nationalist People's Coalition)
Danilo Carino (Independent)
Edgar Danday Sr. (Independent)
Baby Carcellar (Independent)

Elected officials (2010-2013)
Mayor
Lucia Latorre Astorga

Vice mayor
Arthur Zamora Losa

Municipal councilors
Benjamin Sauro Amistoso
Florentino Paragas Carcellar Jr.
Ronnie Quitalig Casiano
Jimmy Achaso Barrantes
Henry Verzosa Astorga
Dante Bulan Gososo
Danilo Pajares Cariño
Edgar Redaja Danday Sr.

Infrastructure 
Daram offers limited urban and extensive basic rural infrastructure that includes water-based transportation, a plentiful public water supply, electrical supply from SAMELCO II, cellular and cable communication facilities, sports and recreational facilities, tourist spots, and common service establishments.

Education

Primary schools
Daram has 58 primary schools.

Secondary schools
Daram has 8 secondary schools.

Bagacay NHS
Bakhaw NHS
Birawan NHS
Cabiton-an Integrated School
Daram NHS
Parasan NHS
Rizal Integrated School
Sua NHS

References

External links

 Daram Profile at PhilAtlas.com
 [ Philippine Standard Geographic Code]
 Philippine Census Information
 Local Governance Performance Management System 

Municipalities of Samar (province)
Island municipalities in the Philippines
Establishments by Philippine executive order